The 2002–03 season was FC Basel's 110th season of competition, and the club's 9th consecutive season in the Nationalliga A, the top flight of Swiss football. Basel played their home games in the newly constructed St. Jakob-Park complex. René C. Jäggi had been the club chairman for the previous six seasons, but stood down at the AGM in October, and businessman Werner Edelmann was elected as the new chairman.

The club sought to retain the Swiss Nationalliga A and Swiss Cup titles after winning the double the previous season. They also sought to compete in the Champions League for as long as possible, as well as reach its group stage.

Basel ended the domestic league season as runners-up in the league and winners of the Swiss Cup. They also reached the second group stage of the Champions League.

Overview

Off-season and pre-season
Basel started the season with high aspirations as reigning champions and cup holders. Basel and Grasshopper Club Zürich were the favourites to win the domestic championship title. Basel chose winning the championship as their top goal. Their second objective was to defend the Swiss Cup because it would be played at their home stadium, St. Jakob-Park. Basel also entered the 2002–03 Champions League in the second qualifying round and aimed to reach the group stage.

Massimo Ceccaroni retired from his professional career prior to the season. Ceccaroni is still considered to be a cult figure in Basel, due to his 25 years total of loyalty towards the club and the fact that he never scored a goal in the top flight of Swiss football. As a result of making very few appearances for the team the previous season, the club decided not to renew his contract at the end of the season, and his professional career came to an end. Ceccaroni played a total of 605 games for Basel from 1987 to 2002. 398 of these games were in the Nationalliga A and Nationalliga B, 34 in the Swiss Cup, 20 in the European competitions (UEFA cup and UIC) and 153 were friendly games. He scored six goals throughout his career, four in the Nationalliga B and two during friendlies. Other players who left the squad included fellow retirees Oliver Kreuzer and Romain Crevoisier, and Miroslav König, who transferred to Zürich.

Soon after the season began, Philippe Cravero moved to Servette, first on loan and then definitively. During his tenure of just over four seasons with the club between 1998 and 2002, Cravero played 185 games for Basel, scoring a total of five goals. 108 of these games were in the Nationalliga A, 8 in the Swiss Cup, 16 in the European competitions (UEFA cup and UIC) and 53 were friendly games. He scored two goals in the domestic league and three in friendly matches.

Christian Gross was the first team trainer for the fourth successive season. Knowing the high aspirations for the season, Gross strengthened the team. Alessandro Iandoli advanced to the first team from the U-21 team.

Six pre-season test games were planned for June and one for early July. The Nationalliga A season began on 6 July 2002 with an away game against Aarau, and the Champions League qualifying started on 31 July with an away tie against Žilina. In the Swiss Cup, all the league teams had a bye and qualified for the round of 32, which was to take place on 22 February 2003.

Winter break
During January 2003, George Koumantarakis left the club and transferred to English team Preston North End, who at that time played in the English Championship.

Campaign

Friendly games
Basel started the season off with various warm-up matches. Their opponents included teams from the Swiss lower league, a team from Brazil, and PSV Eindhoven of the Netherlands. During the summer, Basel visited a training camp in America and played three matches against teams from the USL Premier Development League and Major League Soccer. Basel entered the Sempione Cup, which was played in Balsthal. The club won the first match against Austrian team SK Rapid Wien 3–0 and the second against Slovakian team Inter Bratislava 2–0. Basel were placed second in the final classification.

Domestic league

Qualifying round
The Swiss Football Association (ASF-SFV) were changing the format of the domestic league during the season. Since the 1987–88 Nationalliga A season there had been 24 teams in the Nationalliga, 12 in the Nationalliga A and 12 in the Nationalliga B. In the first stage, there was a qualifying phase played as a double round-robin tournament. Three points were given for a victory and one for a draw. In the second phase, the top eight clubs played a further double round-robin for the championship; each team took half of the points and rounded up to complete units from the qualification round into the second stage as bonus. The last eight teams played against relegation to the amateur league and the last four teams from the top-level played a promotion/relegation round for the top tier in the following season. This was to be the last season in this format. The new format would reduce the number of clubs to 20, with ten teams in the top tier and ten in the second tier. Therefore, this year there was an additional relegation.

The season started well for Basel and they were undefeated in their first seven matches, winning five and drawing two. FCB lost the two following games and slipped seven points behind the Grasshoppers who in the same period had won eight of their nine games. Despite defeating GC on match day 10 in their own Hardturm stadium the following week-end, the rivals remained clear in the ranking. Gross regrouped his team and they won nine and drew two of the following eleven games, catching and overtaking their rivals in the table. A 1–2 home defeat against GC on match day 21 cost FCB the lead. Grasshoppers ended the league qualifying stage as table leaders at the winter break with 49 points, two points clear.

Championship round
In the championship playoff round Basel only lost two away games, winning 10 of 14 games. Despite this, because both direct ties against the Grasshoppers were drawn, the Zurich-based club managed to snatch the title by a single point at the end of the season. The Grasshoppers remained undefeated in the championship group and ended the season with 57 points. Basel were second with 56, 21 points ahead of third placed Xamax. As champions, GC qualified for the 2003–04 Champions League third qualifying round. As runners-up, Basel qualified for the UEFA Cup first round.

In the home match in St. Jakob-Park on 19 April 2003, Hakan Yakin had a good game and scored a perfect hat-trick during the first half of the game as Basel won 3–0 against Young Boys. Yakin showed his other side in the return match in the Stadion Neufeld in Bern one week later. As Young Boys went a goal up, Yakin lost his temper and kicked the ball away, thus collecting a yellow card. Just ten minutes later he committed a rough foul, collecting a second yellow card. By rule, a player that receives two yellow cards in one game is issued a red card and ejected for the remainder of the match, so Yakin was dismissed.

Domestic cup
As cup holders the club's aim was to defend the trophy, or at minimum to reach the final, because the final would be played in their home stadium St. Jakob-Park. In the cup, all the league teams had a bye for the early rounds and started in the fifth round, which was scheduled for February. Here they were seeded and could not play against each other. In a match, the home advantage was granted to the team from the lower league, if applicable. Basel were drawn against lower league Yverdon-Sport.

Yverdon-Sport (22 February 2003)
The match was held at Stade Municipal in Yverdon-les-Bains and had an attendance of 2,800 fans. After a foul from Gil Bala on Hervé Tum inside the area, Mario Cantaluppi converted the subsequent spot-kick in the 16th minute. Basel controlled the game and could have gone further ahead in the 29th minute, but Julio Hernán Rossi's shot rebounded from the post. In the fortieth minute, Cantaluppi scored his second goal. Following the goal celebrations Rossi was shown a red card for unsportsmanlike behavior. Despite having one man less on the field, Basel dominated the second period and Carlos Varela had a shot against the cross bar. One minute before time Timothée Atouba scored following a set piece to make the final score 3–0 for the visitors.

Servette (4 March 2003)
In the round of 16, Basel was drawn against Servette and played at home in the St. Jakob-Park with an attendance of 10,721 spectators. The match was played on level terms and possession was even for the first half-hour. Basel then increased the tempo and pushed the visitors back, creating two good chances, but Christian Giménez failed with both opportunities. Following a corner-kick Basel was awarded a penalty, which was converted by Mario Cantaluppi in the 35th minute. After the break, FCB pushed forward with Giménez and Julio Hernán Rossi often outrunning the defense. After one such move in the 51st minute, Scott Chipperfield was played into position, and his left footed shot gave the team a two-goal lead. Following this, Basel controlled the game, occasionally using their speed, but content to control the ball and the play. The match ended with a 2–0 win for the home team.

Young Boys (26 March 2003)
In the quarter-finals, FCB were drawn away against Young Boys. The match took place in the sold out Stadion Neufeld in Bern in front of 10,700 spectators. Despite two early goals from Christian Giménez in the 2nd and 28th minute, YB picked up and turned the game and took the lead. Gürkan Sermeter scored his first goal in the 38th minute, and his second in the 42nd. To make things worse for Basel, Varela picked up two yellow cards during the first half and was dismissed. The score was level as the teams went into the interval, but YB had a one-man advantage. After the break, YB continued their forward pressing and Sermeter completed his hattrick in the 55th minute. Basel then created two good chances. The first went wide of Paolo Collaviti's goal and the second, a header from Murat Yakin, was pushed against the cross bar by Collaviti, but Hervé Tum was in place to sink the rebound from close range. The score remained level at 3–3 at the end of regular time. Hakan Yakin scored the deciding goal and Basel won 4–3 after extra time.

Schaffhausen (15 April 2003)
Basel were drawn against lower-league club Schaffhausen in the semi-final. Again, FCB were able to play at home in St. Jakob-Park, which had an attendance of 26,960 spectators. Basel dominated the play from early in the game and the Schaffhausen defence had problems. In the 5th minute Mario Cantaluppi's shot rebounded from the post. In the 7th minute, Julio Hernán Rossi scored, but the goal was disallowed due to a player in an offside position. The Schaffhausen defenders Leu and Fehr were both shown yellow card within the first 23 minutes. In the 26th minute, Antonio Esposito put the home team one goal up. Basel continued to dominate the game but were content to control the ball and play and not to endanger their defense. Yet as the second period ticked away, it became evident that the FCB players were becoming frustrated because they could not add another goal. Scott Chipperfield and Esposito were both shown yellow cards because of this. Jean-Michel Tchouga netted in the 70th minute, but the goal was disallowed due to reckless play. Eventually the team got their second goal in the 90th minute, with Hervé Tum slotting the ball home from the edge of the area. Two minutes later, Esposito netted his second goal and the team's third. Basel advanced as Schaffhausen were defeated.

Neuchâtel Xamax (11 May 2003)
The 78th cup final was played in St. Jakob-Park. It was sold out with 31,500 spectators. The final was played between FCB and Xamax; it was a one-sided affair. Benjamin Huggel scored the first goal in the 13th minute, initiating the early demise of Xamax. Christian Gimenez scored two goals within eight minutes in the 35th and 43rd minute, effectively deciding the game before the break. In the 65th minute, as Murat Yakin slotted home the fourth, following a rebound out of the area from the completely overwhelmed Xamax defence, any doubts about the outcome of the game were wiped out. Boris Smiljanic scored in the 77th minute and Sébastien Barberis followed suit in the 83rd minute, scoring the last two goals in the highest cup final score since GC's 10–0 win over Lausanne in 1937. FC Basel achieved their seventh cup victory. The win meant FCB achieved qualification to the UEFA Cup first round.

Champions League

Qualifying rounds

Žilina
In the second qualifying round of the Champions League, Basel were drawn against Slovakian club Žilina, and after a 1–1 draw in the first leg, came away with a 4–1 win on aggregate. The first leg was played in the Štadión pod Dubňom in Žilina on 31 July 2002. Miroslav Barčík put the home team a goal up after just 29 minutes, but Basel then put on the pressure and Marián Klago could not help but score an own goal just nine minutes later. In the return leg in St. Jakob-Park on 7 August 2002 Basel played a better and faster game. Christian Giménez put them a goal ahead after just 11 minutes and Murat Yakin doubled their lead 12 minutes later. Basel then controlled the game. It was again Giménez who netted soon after half-time and, from here on, the game seemed to be settled. Vladimír Staš scored a consolation goal for the visitors ten minutes from time.

Celtic
In the third qualifying round, Basel faced Scottish giants Celtic on 14 August. In the first leg, away at Celtic Park, the home side won 3–1. After just 92 seconds, Christian Giménez stunned the home crowd with a goal for the visitors. Murat Yakin slid a nice pass through to striker Gimenez, who pushed the ball under the advancing goalkeeper Rab Douglas. However, Celtic equalized a few seconds later from the penalty spot. Swedish international Henrik Larsson played a pass between the defenders through to Stilian Petrov, who was fouled by Swiss international Marco Zwyssig. The Swede himself stepped forward and shot his penalty kick past Pascal Zuberbühler into the bottom corner of the goal. The teams were level until, in the second half, Celtic applied more pressure. Chris Sutton missed his first chance, but he put the home team ahead just two minutes later. Basel reacted and had a few chances, but Celtic held their lead and, two minutes from time, Mohammed Sylla hit a fine volley to give Celtic their victory.

The second leg at St. Jakob-Park was on 28 August. Basel started the game at a high tempo and Celtic could have been a goal behind after just three minutes, but midfielder Paul Lambert stretched his leg out to block a close range shot from Ivan Ergic. Celtic was caught out by the pace and a clever move from the home side in the eighth minute. Hakan Yakin had the ball played to him as he ran to the goal line and he then played a left-footed reverse pass to split the visiting defense, allowing Christian Giménez to race through and his right-footed shot passed below goalkeeper Rab Douglas. The Glasgow side could have leveled soon after, but Henrik Larsson's firm header went straight into Basel keeper Pascal Zuberbuhler's arms from just five yards out. Celtic started the match with an unfamiliar back four and with four midfielders. Without the extra width provided by their normal 3-5-2 formation, they lacked their usual threat when going forward. The home team, backed by a noisy capacity crowd, had their heads up and they were soon rewarded with another goal. Murat Yakin jumped higher than both Bobo Baldé and Ulrik Laursen to head home a corner kick after 22 minutes. Celtic made two substitutions at half time, Didier Agathe and Steve Guppy coming on to play on the flanks in their usual formation and the Scots were immediately on the offensive. First a deflected shot from Stilian Petrov went narrowly wide, then Henrik Larsson's shot was blocked. Celtic were denied a goal by the resolute Basel defense. With determination and drive, Celtic were in charge of the game for long periods in the second half. However, they struggled to create good goal-scoring chances. Chris Sutton's header made at the near post was easily saved by goalkeeper Pascal Zuberbühler and a wide range shot from Mohammed Sylla was harmless and easily dealt with by the keeper as well. Substitute John Hartson had the best chance in the 71st minute, but Zuberbuhler's right hand blocked the close-range header. In the final minute of added time, a Sutton shot passed just inches wide of the left goalpost, but this was the end of the Celtic siege on the Swiss side's goal. Basel were able to rescue the tie in the return match, coming away with a 2–0 victory, to draw 3–3 on aggregate. Basel thus proceeded to the group stage on the away goals rule. 

Basel's success saw them become only the second Swiss team ever to play in the modern Champions League. Celtic's defeat meant that they would continue in the 2002–03 UEFA Cup, entering in the First round and eventually progressing to the final.

First group stage

Spartak
In the group stage Basel were drawn in Group B along with Valencia, Liverpool and Spartak Moscow. Match day 1 of the group stage gave Basel a home match against Spartak Moscow on 17 September cheered on by a sell-out crowd of close to 30,000. Julio Hernán Rossi gave Spartak their first scare in the 15th minute as he sent a header into the net past Stanislav Cherchesov, but Basel's Argentine striker was ruled offside. In the 23rd minute, Murat Yakin headed the ball against the post after a corner. Thirty seconds later his younger brother, Hakan Yakin, had his first chance, but he headed the ball just wide of Cherchesov's goal. In the 43rd minute, Hakan was again on target with a bicycle kick, but keeper Cherchesov caught it. After the half-time break, Basel were still showing that they were in control. In the 50th minute, Hakan Yakin put FC Basel on the path to victory, latching on to Christian Eduardo Giménez's pass to shoot left-footed into the net. Five minutes later, Rossi was able to dribble around the Spartak defense and place his shot beyond keeper Cherchesov to give his team a two-goal lead. Rossi narrowly missed the goal as his header hit the crossbar in the 70th minute. The visitors were missing their injured captain, Yegor Titov, Basel dominated nearly all the match and had a number of near misses later in the match.

Liverpool
Basel traveled to Anfield on match day 2 on 25 September to claim a 1–1 draw against Liverpool. Above everything, the noise created by the 3,500 Basel fans among the 37,634 spectators before, during and after the match remains one of the most memorable things about this match. Liverpool were quickly into the game and created two or three good chances in the first quarter of an hour, but they were only warming up the Basel goalkeeper Pascal Zuberbühler, who was having a good day. The visitors then battled back into the game, but the home team remained in charge. Liverpool's new signing Milan Baroš scored with his first attempt on goal in the 34th minute and this was to be the only time that Zuberbühler was beaten. Julio Hernán Rossi equalized shortly before the break from the only really good chance that the visitors created. Liverpool pressed for the win in the second half, but whenever central defenders Alexandre Quennoz or Murat Yakin made a mistake, keeper Zuberbühler stood firm on the line to save the day for his team.

Valencia
It rained all day on 2 October on Spain's south-eastern coast, and minutes before kick-off in the Valencia-Basel match in the half full Mestalla Stadium, it started to pour. It poured throughout the entire game. The hosts coped better with the conditions, keeping the ball in the air and off the soggy ground. Hardly properly organized and struggling through the countless pools of water spread over the pitch, Basel's game was hopelessly lost and very soon all focus was on damage limitation. It was a thankless and difficult task for the visitors against the rampant Spaniards, who kept the ball and opponents running. John Carew in the 10th and again in the 14th minute put the hosts two goals up. Fábio Aurélio added the third after 17 minutes and Rubén Baraja added the fourth even before the match was half an hour old. Playing without self-confidence, the Basel forwards never threatened goalkeeper Santiago Cañizares throughout the first half.

Only after the break and some clear words from coach Christian Gross were the FCB players able to absorb something. Carlos Varela came on for defender Timothée Atouba and he appeared alone in front of Cañizares after just a few seconds. The Spanish International keeper managed to clear, but was powerless against Julio Hernán Rossi's quick reaction second shot. But the locals quickly shifted their attention to the other side. Miguel Ángel Angulo hit the lower edge of the bar in the 49th minute and Mista saw his shot cleared off the goal line by captain Murat Yakin, before it snuck in again behind the powerless Pascal Zuberbühler. Pablo Aimar and Mista made it 6–1 for the home team. The biggest FCB defeat in the European Cup after the 0–5 against Celtic Glasgow 38 years earlier seemed to be on its way. But thanks to the late strike by Hakan Yakin, at least this disgrace was averted. After two good results Basel were brought back down to earth by a 6–2 demolition against Valencia.

Valencia return match
However, Basel bounced back and held Valencia to a 2–2 draw on match day 4 in St. Jakob-Park three weeks later. Valencia had already qualified for the second group stage and played with a kind of B team and this time the FCB team was ready for the game. Basel controlled the game from the first minutes, not creating too many chances, but pinning the visitors into their own half. Ivan Ergić eventually put the home team a goal up in the 32nd minute. But Valencia reacted immediately and only four minutes later Rubén Baraja leveled the score. In the second half the visitors were more in charge and after 72 minutes Curro Torres put them ahead. This time the home team reacted and played good moves towards captain and keeper Santiago Cañizares who had to deal with a few dangerous shots. However, he was beaten by an Ergić shot in the last minute of regular time and the added injury time passed without a change in the score.

Spartak return match
Basel had slipped from second place in the group to third, as Liverpool had won both games against Spartak. Basel needed to win at least one of their last two games and needed Liverpool to fail to pick up more than two points. In match day five, Liverpool lost 1–0 to Valencia and Basel played away against Spartak at the Luzhniki Stadium. Basel started well into the match, but had a shock as Antonio Esposito injured himself in the early minutes and was replaced by Timothée Atouba. Nevertheless, they did not lose their concentration and Julio Hernán Rossi put them one up after 18 minutes. Spartak then had more of the game pressing forward but not really troubling the Basel back four. In total they had five corner kicks and 12 attempts at goal. Basel played looking for counter-attacks, but were caught off-side 11 times. Two minutes before the end of time the counter-attack was well played and Christian Giménez went clear to put the ball past keeper Maksym Levytskyi to secure the 2–0 victory.

Liverpool return match
Basel were in second place in the group table, but their place in the last 16 was all but secured - all they had to do was to make sure they did not lose to Liverpool in the last game of the first group stage. Basel prepared themselves for this match with a training camp in the Black Forest, where the schedule was composed of videos, lectures and quizzing of the players. The team must have felt they were being introduced into a cult and if so, they emerged from this with enthusiasm and eagerness of true believers. Liverpool, on the other hand, were initially engulfed by a crisis of faith. The Liverpool coach Gérard Houllier's strategy proved to be founded on a slight misconception and knowing that he had to win, he persuaded himself that he could afford to leave out the calm player Salif Diao in the interests of fielding a more expressive line-up from the beginning.

The game began for Liverpool in the worst possible manner. In the second minute, Danny Murphy lost the ball to Antonio Esposito, who immediately beat the offside trap with a well played diagonal pass to Hakan Yakin. Yakin's low, but fast cross ball bounced inconveniently in the middle of the penalty area, but the quick thinking Julio Hernan Rossi, who had also scored at Anfield, converted Yakin's pass perfectly. The only Liverpool effort to be remembered in the first half was a good drive by Emile Heskey that Pascal Zuberbühler tipped over the crossbar after 10 minutes. A superb move resulted in Basel's second goal. Rossi moved to the right and then played a square pass towards Christian Giménez. The Liverpool back four just watched in awe as Giménez burst through to take the ball and nip it past keeper Jerzy Dudek. In the 29th minute, Dudek parried Yakin's free-kick, only for Timothée Atouba to net the rebound. The home supporters were singing loudly before the goal and after it the noise was deafening and never ending. Basel's attacks were damaging Liverpool reputations decisively and the visitors were especially ineffective in the midfield area.

Liverpool fought back, but the road to parity was steep. However, Liverpool climbed it well with purpose and strength as the Basel team became tired. Salif Diao came in for a poor Steven Gerrard and he restored the team order and, after an hour, began the build-up that saw Murphy finish accurately after being neatly teed up by midfielder Vladimir Smicer. Smicer then added a goal of his own after 64 minutes, stretching himself to the limit to force home a pass from Milan Baros. As Murat Yakin then handled a low ball on the ground, with Michael Owen swerving past him, there was almost euphoria. Owen himself took the penalty, Zuberbühler blocked it but Owen pushed in the loose ball. Nevertheless, the home crowd were still singing their songs very loud and the score remained at 3–3 right up until the final whistle. Basel thus qualified for the next round.

As third placed team in the group, Liverpool continued in the 2002–03 UEFA Cup and entered in the final phase. Here they would advance to the Quarter-finals, where they were drawn against and knocked out by Celtic, who, in their turn, were to advance to the final to play against Porto.

Second group stage
In the round of 16, Basel was drawn into group D together with Manchester United, Juventus and Deportivo de La Coruña. Basel were now quite renowned for their early pressing and their goals in the opening minutes. They had achieved an early goal against Žilina, one in both games against Celtic, as well as one against Spartak Moscow, before their second-minute goal against Liverpool. In addition to this, they also achieved an early lead in eight of their 20 domestic league matches up until this time, so the opponents were warned.

Manchester United
As expected the match day 1 game on 26 November 2002 between Manchester United and Basel started extraordinarily fast. Immediately after the kick-off, Basel's Julio Hernán Rossi sprinted into the United penalty area and forced a clearance from Wes Brown, after Basel captain Murat Yakin had played a precise long ball. Hakan Yakin curled in the corner ball and Rossi placed a fine header low, near the goalpost. This was brilliantly headed off the line by Quinton Fortune. But the ball landed by Scott Chipperfield and his fierce shot was deflected in by Christian Giminez past the helpless Fabien Barthez after just 31 seconds. Sir Alex Ferguson looked on in disgust from the sidelines, he had warned his players. Hakan Yakin was denied the second goal after he ran amok, dribbling around the United defenders, turning them inside out. Just one minute later he did it again and set up Rossi, whose shot was saved in extremis by keeper Barthez. Not even one minute later Juan Verón gave the ball away to Gimenez, and didn't make much effort to get it back, and the goal-scorer tried to chip Barthez. As the Frenchman back-pedaled furiously, the ball landed on the roof of the goal. Basel remained in control and Paul Scholes was lucky to get away with just a yellow card after he first fouled Hakan Yakin and then Mario Cantaluppi. Seconds after the booking, Scholes lunged in again with a terribly clumsy tackle on Ivan Ergić and he remained very fortunate not to have been sent off. After the break United were better. A fine cross from Ole Gunnar Solskjær was met nicely by Ruud van Nistelrooy's forehead and the ball ended in the net. One minute later van Nistelrooy struck again. From the narrowest of angles, because he was on the by-line, he slotted the ball past Pascal Zuberbühler in the Basel goal. Six minutes later Solskjaer added his own name to the scorers' list with a low hard shot between Zubi's legs. The game was decided at this moment and Basel suffered a 1–3 defeat.

Juventus
After heavy snowfall in and around Turin, the day 2 game on 11 December suffered from the poor pitch and in the early stages also from heavy fog. The hosts Juventus took a 1–0 lead after a header relay between Mark Iuliano and David Trezeguet in the 3rd minute. However, the Swiss were able to recover quickly from the early deficit and dominated the game for the next quarter of an hour, but Christian Giménez in particular was unable to take advantage of the chances they had created. The Italians were back almost as if at the push of a button and appeared dangerous time and again in front of the box of Basel goalkeeper Pascal Zuberbühler. In the 34th minute, just as Basel seemed to be getting the better, Paolo Montero was spot on and dusted off to make it 2–0. Zuberbühler was only able to parry an Alessandro Del Piero free kick. Shortly before the end of the first half, Alessio Tacchinardi's long-range shot meant Juventus went into the break 3-0 up. The second half also saw Basel going forward, but the Italians scored the next goal. Pavel Nedvěd fell in the penalty area, referee Lucílio Batista imposed a disputed penalty, and Del Piero made it 4–0. At least one cannot blame Basel of giving up - The outsider fought continued to look for their chance to get at least a consolation goal. However, their fast counterattacks mostly came to an end at the edge of the penalty area, and the final pass rarely reached its goal with the vigilant Juve defense. Shots from a distance were never a problem for goalkeeper Gianluigi Buffon. The result was an unpleasant 0–4 defeat for Basel.

Deportivo
The game on day 3 was after the winter break, on 19 February 2003 with Basel at home in the St. Jakob-Park against Deportivo de La Coruña. Again the match started fast and Christian Gross's Basel team made attempts for an early goal. However, Javier Irureta's Deportivo could have taken the lead twice. Basel captain Murat Yakin together with midfielder Mario Cantaluppi were able to calm things down and Basel took control of the match after about 15 minutes and they pressed forwards. However, it wasn't until the 30th minute that they had their first really good chance, Christian Giménez failed against goalkeeper Juanmi. Only a few seconds later Hakan Yakin also had a chance at goal and he put the hosts 1-0 up. From here on the game was very tactical, neither team wanting to make a mistake. Basel could have increased their lead two or three times, and Deportivo could have equalised, but weren't as commanding. The game ended with victory for the home team and they managed to give themselves hope of reaching the quarter-finals.

Deportivo return match
The return match was played just six days later on 25 February in Estadio Riazor in A Coruña. Deportivo were again ready for the quick starting visitors, whose first chance in the second minute was blocked. Again Basel came forward, but the chance was foiled early and the hosts had a well played counterattack. Diego Tristán ran clear and was able to put his side a goal up in the fourth minute. Deportivo then controlled their defensive area, allowing Basel freedom in mid-field. The match was played tactically by the home side and the visitors, with their goalkeeper Pascal Zuberbühler as captain for the injured Murat Yakin, could not find the space that they would have liked against the well defending opponents. During the early minutes of the second period Basel created their best chances, but it soon became apparent that they were tiring. Deportivo controlled the last twenty-odd minutes easily and won the game 1–0, which left them third in the table with four points, above their opponents who had just three points.

Manchester United return match
Arguably two of Basel's greatest ever European games, up until now, came next. First, they held Manchester United to a 1–1 draw at Old Trafford on 12 March. Despite having achieved just one victory and having scored only two goals in the first four matches of the second group stage, Basel were only a point behind the duo Deportivo and Juventus. Victory over United, who had already assured their automatic qualification for the knock-out stage, would set up an epic finish as Basel would entertain Juventus for the last match of the group. Head coach Christian Gross had been thorough with his planning before the trip to Manchester. The team flew early to England, on the day after their weekend league win over Servette, to avoid the temptation of a player's visit to the local Fasnacht.

Well over 3,000 Basel fans travelled to support their team in the Theatre of Dreams; 23 charter planes arrived at Manchester airport that day alone. The entire fan block was in their sector, singing and chanting, well over an hour before kick-off. The Basel team, being pushed on by their fans, started fast and furious, creating three early chances before United had their first. In the 14th minute, Christian Giménez controlled a cross with this chest and right footed a volley beyond keeper Roy Carroll, who played in place of regular goalie Fabien Barthez. United tried to react, but failed in their attempt to pressurise the Basel defense, and it was the guests who were dominating the match. Manager Alex Ferguson had also given the regulars David Beckham, Ruud van Nistelrooy, Ryan Giggs and Paul Scholes a break by leaving them on the Bench, at the same time giving Kieran Richardson his debut for the team. The United manager was getting increasingly irritated by the team's performance and at half time he brought on Giggs. In the 53rd minute, a wide ranged, left-footed shot from captain Gary Neville was unluckily deflected beyond Zuberbühler to level the score. But, despite this, Basel were playing better and closer to taking the lead again. Ferguson reacted in the 73rd minute — he brought on Beckham and Scholes in an attempt to win the match. During the last few minutes Basel had another two or three chances but the final score remained 1–1.

Juventus return match
The situation before match day six of this second group stage was clear. United were group winners and Juventus were three points clear of the duo Basel and Deportivo, Basel needed at least a four-goal victory at St. Jakob-Park on 18 March to overtake their match day opponents and go through to the next round. Referee was the German Wolfgang Stark and the stadium was sold-out with over 30,500 spectators. The Italians had the better start and on ten minutes, broke through; Cristian Zenoni fed Alessio Tacchinardi, whose left-footed long range shot gave keeper Pascal Zuberbühler no chance. This only doubled Basel's determination and they reacted well and put on the pressure immediately, having two good chances within a short time. Hakan Yakin, with a clever chip, forced keeper Gianluigi Buffon to tip the ball wide of the post and he also had to save a shot from Scott Chipperfield. After 38 minutes Basel were deservedly level. A sloppy clearance from Mark Iuliano was caught and pushed on by Christian Giménez and Mario Cantaluppi reacted quickly to volley home his first Champions League goal. Hakan Yakin again forced Buffon to make another fine save so that Juventus could hold on before half-time. In the second period Basel continued to dominate the match. Sébastien Barberis' shot, just three minutes into the second half, went narrowly over the bar. Juventus continued to defend their area in numbers, but, at the other end, Pavel Nedved remained a threat. Swiss international Hakan Yakin had a good chance as he pounced on a poor clearance in front of goal from Lilian Thuram, but a quick reacting Iuliano ensured that Yakin could not get full contact. Basel went even closer following a corner after 67 minutes, but a Giménez header hit the crossbar. Juventus looked stronger after this, but in the second and final minute of added time, Basel forced their tenth corner. Cantaluppi's corner kick was flicked on by Chipperfield and Giménez volleyed the ball over the line and his side claimed a 2–1 victory.

Conclusion
The victory meant that Basel finished the second group stage level on points with both Juventus and Deportivo La Coruña. In the six games between the three teams level, Juventus' better points tally meant that they went on to the quarter-finals. Despite being knocked out on tie-breaking criteria, Basel had achieved their season's European aim easily. The season's impressive Champions League run brought them much acknowledgement and praise. It also earned the club well over 20 million Swiss Francs in performance bonuses. This additional revenue should keep Basel in touch with all the other Swiss league contenders, but is well shy of the finances of teams such as Real Madrid, Juventus or Manchester United.

Club staff

Management

Other information

First team squad

Left club during season

Transfers

Summer

In

Out

Winter

Out

Results

Friendlies

Pre-season and first half-season friendlies

Winter break and second half-season friendlies

Nationalliga A

Qualification phase
The qualification round to the 2002–03 league season was contested by twelve teams. The eight teams at the top of the table at the end of the regular season (or qualification) were then to compete in the championship play-off round.

League table

Championship round
The first eight teams of the regular season (or Qualification) competed in the Championship Playoff Round. They took half of the points (rounded up) gained in Qualification as bonus with them.

Final league table

Swiss Cup

Champions League

Second qualifying round

Basel won 4–1 on aggregate

Third qualifying round

3–3 on aggregate, Basel won on away goals

Group stage

Second group stage

References

Sources
 Rotblau: Jahrbuch Saison 2015/2016. Publisher: FC Basel Marketing AG. 
 Rotblau: Jahrbuch Saison 2017/2018. Publisher: FC Basel Marketing AG. 
 Die ersten 125 Jahre / 2018. Publisher: Josef Zindel im Friedrich Reinhardt Verlag, Basel. 
 2002–03 at "Basler Fussballarchiv” homepage

External links
 FC Basel official site

FC Basel seasons
Basel